Somboon Pattra (born 26 May 1932) is a Thai sports shooter. He competed in the men's 25 metre rapid fire pistol event at the 1976 Summer Olympics.

References

1932 births
Living people
Somboon Pattra
Somboon Pattra
Shooters at the 1976 Summer Olympics
Place of birth missing (living people)
Somboon Pattra